The Kingdom of Khotan was an ancient Buddhist Saka kingdom located on the branch of the Silk Road that ran along the southern edge of the Taklamakan Desert in the Tarim Basin (modern Xinjiang, China). The ancient capital was originally sited to the west of modern-day Hotan at Yotkan (Chinese: 约特干; pinyin: Yuētègàn). From the Han dynasty until at least the Tang dynasty it was known in Chinese as Yutian (or ). This largely Buddhist kingdom existed for over a thousand years until it was conquered by the Muslim Kara-Khanid Khanate in 1006, during the Islamicisation and Turkicisation of Xinjiang.

Built on an oasis, Khotan's mulberry groves allowed the production and export of silk and carpets, in addition to the city's other major products such as its famous nephrite jade and pottery. Despite being a significant city on the silk road as well as a notable source of jade for ancient China, Khotan itself is relatively small – the circumference of the ancient city of Khotan at Yōtkan was about 2.5 to 3.2 km (1.5 to 2 miles). Much of the archaeological evidence of the ancient city of Khotan however had been obliterated due to centuries of treasure hunting by local people.

The inhabitants of Khotan used Khotanese, an Eastern Iranian language, and Gandhari Prakrit, an Indo-Aryan language related to Sanskrit. There is debate as to how much Khotan's original inhabitants were ethnically and anthropologically Indo-Aryan and speakers of the Gāndhārī language versus the Saka, an Indo-European people of Iranian branch from the Eurasian Steppe. From the 3rd century onwards they also had a visible linguistic influence on the Gāndhārī language spoken at the royal court of Khotan. The Khotanese Saka language was also recognized as an official court language by the 10th century and used by the Khotanese rulers for administrative documentation.

Names
The kingdom of Khotan was given various names and transcriptions. Sometimes they also used Jusadanna, derived from Indo-Iranian Gostan and Gostana, the names of the town and region around it respectively. Others include Huanna. To the Tibetans in the seventh and eighth centuries, the kingdom was called Li (or Li-yul) and the capital city Hu-ten, Hu-den, Hu-then and Yvu-then.

The name as written by the locals changed over time; in about the third century AD, the local people wrote Khotana in Kharoṣṭhī script, and Hvatäna in the Brahmi script some time later. From this came Hvamna and Hvam in their latest texts, where Hvam kṣīra or 'the land of Khotan' was the name given. Khotan became known to the west while the –t- was still unchanged, as is frequent in early New Persian. The local people also used Gaustana (Gosthana, Gostana, Godana, Godaniya or Kustana) under the influence of Buddhist Hybrid Sanskrit, and Yūttina in the ninth century, when it was allied with the Chinese kingdom of Șacū (Shazhou or Dunhuang).

Location and geography

The geographical position of the oasis was the main factor in its success and wealth. To its north is one of the most arid and desolate desert climates on the earth, the Taklamakan Desert, and to its south the largely uninhabited Kunlun Mountains (Qurum).  To the east there were few oases beyond Niya, making travel difficult, and access is only relatively easy from the west. 
 
Khotan was irrigated from the Yurung-kàsh and Kara-kàsh rivers, which water the Tarim Basin. These two rivers produce vast quantities of water, which made habitation possible in an otherwise arid climate. The location next to the mountain not only allowed irrigation for crops but also increased the fertility of the land, as the rivers reduced the gradient and deposited sediment on their banks, creating a more fertile soil. This more fertile soil increased the agricultural productivity that made Khotan famous for its cereal crops and fruit. Therefore, Khotan's lifeline was its proximity to the Kunlun mountain range, and without it Khotan would not have become one of the largest and most successful oasis cities along the Silk Roads.

The kingdom of Khotan was one of the many small states found in the Tarim Basin, which included Yarkand, Loulan (Shanshan), Turfan, the Kashgar, Karashahr, and Kucha (the last three, together with Khotan, made up the four Garrisons during the Tang dynasty). To the west were the Central Asian kingdoms of Sogdiana and Bactria. It was surrounded by powerful neighbours, such as the Kushan Empire, China, Tibet, and for a time the Xiongnu, all of which had exerted or tried to exert their influence over Khotan at various times.

History
From an early period, the Tarim Basin had been inhabited by different groups of Indo-European speakers such as the Tocharians and Saka people. Jade from Khotan had been traded into China for a long time before the founding of the city, as indicated by items made of jade from Khotan found in tombs from the Shang (Yin) and Zhou dynasties. The jade trade is thought to have been facilitated by the Yuezhi.

Foundation legend

There are four versions of the legend of the founding of Khotan. These may be found in accounts given by the Chinese pilgrim Xuanzang and in Tibetan translations of Khotanese documents. All four versions suggest that the city was founded around the third century BC by a group of Indians during the reign of Ashoka. According to one version, the nobles of a tribe in ancient Taxila, who traced their ancestry to the deity Vaiśravaṇa, were said to have blinded Kunãla, a son of Ashoka. In punishment they were banished by the Mauryan emperor to the north of the Himalayas, where they settled in Khotan and elected one of their members as king. However war then ensued with another group from China whose leader then took over as king, and the two colonies merged. In a different version, it was Kunãla himself who was exiled and founded Khotan.

The legend suggests that Khotan was settled by people from northwest India and China, and may explain the division of Khotan into an eastern and western city since the Han dynasty. Others however argued that the legend of the founding of Khotan is a fiction as it ignores the Iranian population, and that its purpose was to explain the Indian and Chinese influences that were present in Khotan in the 7th century AD. By Xuanzang's account, it was believed that the royal power had been transmitted unbroken since the founding of Khotan, and evidence indicates that the kings of Khotan had used an Iranian-based word as their title since at least the 3rd century AD, suggesting that they may be speakers of an Iranian language.

In the 1900s, Aurel Stein discovered Prakrit documents written in Kharoṣṭhī in Niya, and together with the founding legend of Khotan, Stein proposed that these people in the Tarim Basin were Indian immigrants from Taxila who conquered and colonized Khotan. The use of Prakrit however may be a legacy of the influence of the Kushan Empire. There were also Greek influences in early Khotan, based on evidence such as Hellenistic artworks found at various sites in the Tarim Basin, for example, the Sampul tapestry found near Khotan, tapestries depicting the Greek god Hermes and the winged pegasus found at nearby Loulan, as well as ceramics that may suggest influences from as far as the Hellenistic kingdom of Ptolemaic Egypt. One suggestion is therefore that the early migrants to the region may have been an ethnically mixed people from the city of Taxila led by a Greco-Saka or an Indo-Greek leader, who established Khotan using the administrative and social organizations of the Greco-Bactrian Kingdom.

Arrival of the Saka

Surviving documents from Khotan of later centuries indicate that the people of Khotan spoke the Saka language, an Eastern Iranian language that was closely related to the Sogdian language (of Sogdiana); as an Indo-European language, Saka was more distantly related to the Tocharian languages (also known as Agnean-Kuchean) spoken in adjoining areas of the Tarim Basin. It also shared areal features with Tocharian. It is not certain when the Saka people moved into the Khotan area.  Archaeological evidence from the Sampul tapestry of Sampul (Shanpulu;  / ), near Khotan may indicate a settled Saka population in the last quarter of the first millennium BC, although some have suggested they may not have moved there until after the founding of the city. The Saka may have inhabited other parts of the Tarim Basin earlier – presence of a people believed to be Saka had been found in the Keriya region at Yumulak Kum (Djoumboulak Koum, Yuansha) around 200 km east of Khotan, possibly as early as the 7th century BC.

The Saka people were known as the Sai (塞, sāi, sək in Old Sinitic) in ancient Chinese records. These records indicate that they originally inhabited the Ili and Chu River valleys of modern Kyrgyzstan and Kazakhstan.  In the Chinese Book of Han, the area was called the "land of the Sai", i.e. the Saka. According to the Sima Qian's Shiji, the Indo-European Yuezhi, originally from the area between Tängri Tagh (Tian Shan) and Dunhuang of Gansu, China, were assaulted and forced to flee from the Hexi Corridor of Gansu by the forces of the Xiongnu ruler Modu Chanyu in 177-176 BC. In turn the Yuezhi were responsible for attacking and pushing the Sai (i.e. Saka) south.   The Saka crossed the Syr Darya into Bactria around 140 B.C. Later the Saka would also move into Northern India, as well as other Tarim Basin sites like Khotan, Karasahr (Yanqi), Yarkand (Shache) and Kucha (Qiuci).  One suggestion is that the Saka became Hellenized in the Greco-Bactrian Kingdom, and they or an ethnically mixed Greco-Scythians either migrated to Yarkand and Khotan, or a bit earlier from Taxila in the Indo-Greek Kingdom.

Documents written in Prakrit dating to the 3rd century AD from neighbouring Shanshan show that the king of Khotan was given the title hinajha (i.e. "generalissimo"), a distinctively Iranian-based word equivalent to the Sanskrit title senapati. This along with the fact that the king's recorded regnal periods were given as Khotanese kṣuṇa, "implies an established connection between the Iranian inhabitants and the royal power," according to the late Professor of Iranian Studies Ronald E. Emmerick (d. 2001). He contended that Khotanese-Saka-language royal rescripts of Khotan dated to the 10th century "makes it likely that the ruler of Khotan was a speaker of Iranian." Furthermore, he elaborated on the early name of Khotan:

Later Khotanese-Saka-language documents, ranging from medical texts to Buddhist literature, have been found in Khotan and Tumshuq (east of Kashgar). Ancient Khotan : vol.1 Ancient Khotan : vol.2

External links
THE SPREAD OF INDIAN ART AND CULTURE TO CENTRAL ASIA AND CHINA
ZENO coins page on Khotan
Smallest ancient temple discovered

Former countries in Chinese history
History of Xinjiang
1006 disestablishments in Asia
States and territories established in the 50s
Sites along the Silk Road
Central Asian Buddhist kingdoms
Tributaries of Imperial China
Former kingdoms